The Roman Catholic Diocese of Penang is situated in the northern region of Malaysia covering 5 states, namely Penang, Perlis, Kedah, Perak and Kelantan. It was created on 25 February 1955 together with the Archdiocese of Kuala Lumpur. It is under the Ecclesiastical province of Kuala Lumpur.

History

The first Catholic priests settled in Malacca in the 1511. College General was established in Ayuthia, Thailand in 1665. It was moved to Cambodia before finally settling in Penang in 1808. A seminary occupied a site in Pulau Tikus before moving to their present site in Tanjung Bungah in 1984. In 1786, Captain Francis Light and his men landed in Penang and decided to build a church there. They constructed a church and it was completed in August 1787. The church was blessed on the Feast of the Assumption (15 August). That was the first church in Penang, named the Church of the Assumption. A few years, later, another priest settled in Penang and used the College General place as their church. This was the second church in Penang named Church of the Immaculate Conception. More churches were constructed.

In 1810, Msgr Garnault as parish priest of the Assumption Church assumed leadership of the Vicariate of Siam and Kedah. Penang became a part of the vicariate which expanded until Singapore. When the Vicariate of Malaya was formed in 1841, Penang became one of its districts, and subsequently went under the jurisdiction of newly formed Diocese of Malacca in 1888.

In the 1940s, World War II affected Penang. Some churches were closed all the time except for Sunday Masses. After World War II, there was a need of setting up a diocese. On 25 February 1955, the Diocese of Malacca was split into an archdiocese with 2 suffragans. The Diocese of Penang was formed together with the Archdiocese of Kuala Lumpur. In 1972, the Archdiocese of Malacca became the new Diocese of Malacca-Johor, when Singapore ceased to be the Metropolitan See. The Diocese of Kuala Lumpur was subsequently elevated, and it became the Metropolitan Archdiocese of Penang and Malacca-Johor until today.

Bishop Francis Chan and Archbishop Dominic Vendargon were the first Malaysian bishops to be ordained. Bishop Francis Chan was the first bishop of Penang. In 1967, due to the demise of Bishop Francis Chan, Bishop Gregory Yong was appointed as the second bishop of Penang. In 1976, Penang hosted the Aggiornamento for all bishops and priests in West Malaysia. In 1977, he was appointed as Archbishop of Singapore. Bishop Anthony Soter Fernandez was ordained and became the third bishop of the diocese. However, in 1983, he was appointed as archbishop of the archdiocese in Kuala Lumpur.

Bishop Antony Selvanayagam then became the fourth bishop of Penang in 1983, he was previously ordained in 1980 and was formerly the auxiliary bishop of Kuala Lumpur. He retired in 2012. On 7 July 2012, the Vatican appointed Rt. Rev Sebastian Francis as the fifth bishop of Penang. He was ordained on 20 August 2012, at St. Anne's Church in Bukit Mertajam, Penang, and installed in September 2012 at the Holy Spirit Cathedral in Gelugor.

In the 1970s, the administration of College General, Peninsular Malaysia's sole Catholic seminary, was handed over to the local clergy. In the 1990s, there were 34 parishes in the diocese. The number of priests have been shrinking, so Bishop Antony made a decision that the four churches located in George Town, Penang were to be emerged as one parish to be called City Parish. Likewise in Perak, the two churches located in Taiping also emerged as one parish as the Taiping Catholic Church. The number of parishes was therefore reduced slightly to 28.

In 2001, the main administration centre of the diocese Pusat Keuskupan Katolik was opened by Bishop Antony. The following year in 2002, the third St Anne's Church, Bukit Mertajam together with the parish centre, domus and administration office, were opened on the Feast of St Anne (26 July) by the then Apostolic Delegate. Also in that year, Bishop Antony decided to remove the cathedral status of the Church of the Assumption to the now Cathedral of the Holy Spirit, after the church was no longer a parish. The Church of the Assumption had failed to meet the diocese's demands and most of the diocese's events are held outside of that church.

The Rite of Dedication for the Cathedral of the Holy Spirit was held on 20 January 2003. In 2005, the Diocese of Penang celebrated its 50th Anniversary. In September 2010, the Church of Divine Mercy was opened. It is the first church opened on Penang Island after 41 years.

Status of the diocese

Today, the Diocese of Penang has 29 parishes as of 2011 (1 each in Perlis and Kelantan, 3 in Kedah, 10 in Penang and 14 in Perak) and 77 chapels. The current Bishop is Rt. Rev Sebastian Francis, D.D who has served the diocese since 7 July 2012 and its vicar general is Msgr Henry Rajoo, Msgr Stephen Liew and Msgr Aloysius Tan. The seat of the bishop is located in Holy Spirit Cathedral since 20 January 2003 and the main office is Pusat Keuskupan Katolik located in George Town, Penang.

The oldest church is Church of the Assumption in George Town, Penang. It was built in 1786 and the latest church is Church of Divine Mercy (Christian Community Centre) located in Sungai Ara, Penang which was opened in September 2010. Peninsular Malaysia's sole Catholic seminary, College General is located in Tanjung Bungah, Penang. Among the notable feast days held in the diocese are the St. Anne's Feast held in St. Anne's Church, Bukit Mertajam, Penang. It attracts almost a million pilgrims without fail every year. The diocese also has transfer of priests every 5 years, with the latest being in October 2010.

Statistical summary
Below are statistics of the diocese as of 2011:
 Approximate total population – 6,800,000
 Estimate Catholic population – 65,355
 Parishes – 29
 Chapels & out-stations – 71
 Baptism – (Infants under 7): 571, Adults: 379
 Religious Sisters – 80
 Religious Brothers – 11
 Seminarians (3 Philosophy, 3 Theology)

List of parishes in the Diocese of Penang

These are the list of parishes in the diocese. They are divided into 3 deaneries, namely Penang Island Deanery, Northern Region Deanery and Perak State Deanery. All parishes and their churches are listed. Chapels are not listed.
 Penang Island Deanery
 Cathedral of the Holy Spirit, Green Lane, Gelugor
 Church of Divine Mercy (Christian Community Centre), Sungai Ara
 City Parish, George Town
 Church of Our Lady of Sorrows, Jalan Macalister (parish centre)
 Church of the Assumption, Farquhar Street
 Church of St. Francis Xavier, Penang Road
 Church of St. John Britto, Sungai Pinang
 Church of the Immaculate Conception, Pulau Tikus
 Church of the Risen Christ, Air Itam
 Church of the Holy Name of Jesus, Balik Pulau
 Northern Region Deanery
 Church of Our Lady of Fatima, Kangar, Perlis
 Church of Our Lady of Fatima of the Holy Rosary, Kota Bharu, Kelantan
 Church of St Michael, Alor Star, Kedah
 Church of Christ The King, Sungai Petani, Kedah
 Church of the Sacred Heart of Jesus, Kulim, Kedah
 Church of St. Anne, Bukit Mertajam, Province Wellesley
 Church of the Holy Name of Mary, Simpang Ampat, Province Wellesley
 Church of the Nativity of the Blessed Virgin Mary, Butterworth, Province Wellesley
 Church of St. Anthony, Nibong Tebal, Province Wellesley
 Perak State Deanery
 Church of Our Lady of Good Health, Parit Buntar
 Church of St. Joseph, Bagan Serai
 Taiping Catholic Church, Taiping
 Church of St. Louis (parish centre)
 Church of the Immaculate Heart of Mary
 Church of St. Patrick, Kuala Kangsar
 Church of St. John The Baptist, Sungai Siput
 Church of St. Michael, Greentown-Pasir Pinji, Ipoh
 Church of Our Lady of Lourdes, Silibin, Ipoh
 Church of Our Mother of Perpetual Help, Ipoh Garden, Ipoh
 Church of St. Joseph, Batu Gajah
 Church of St. Francis De Sales, Sitiawan
 Church of the Sacred Heart, Kampar
 Church of St. Mary, Tapah
 Chapel of St. Anthony, Slim River
 Church of the Most Holy Redeemer, Tanjung Malim
 Church of St. Anthony, Teluk Intan

List of Bishops of Penang
 Francis Chan (1955–1967)
 Gregory Yong (1967–1977)
 Anthony Soter Fernandez (1977–1983)
 Antony Selvanayagam (1983—2012)
 Sebastian Francis (7 July 2012 – present)

List of cathedrals of Penang

 Cathedral of the Assumption (now church), Lebuh Farquhar, George Town, Penang (25 February 1955 – 20 January 2003)
 Cathedral of the Holy Spirit, Green Lane, Gelugor, Penang (20 January 2003 – present)

See also
 Roman Catholicism in Malaysia
 List of Roman Catholic dioceses in Malaysia
 List of Roman Catholic dioceses (structured_view)-Episcopal Conference of Malaysia

References

External links
 Caritas Penang
 
 Catholic-Hierarchy

Christian organizations established in 1955
Penang
Penang
Roman Catholic dioceses and prelatures established in the 20th century
1955 establishments in Malaya